Abd Rabbo Hussein ( Arabic: عبد ربه حسين; d. 22 February 2016, Aden, Yemen) was a Yemeni Army general who commanded the 15th Infantry Brigade of the Hadi government loyalists during the Yemeni Civil War. He was assassinated in February 2016, becoming the highest-ranking commander of the pro-Hadi army to be killed during the conflict. Masked gunmen shot him outside of his residence in Aden, the provisional capital of Yemen.

References

Yemeni military personnel killed in the Yemeni Civil War (2014–present)
Yemeni generals
2016 deaths